Kanakalatha Mukund (née Narasimhan) is an Indian historian. Her areas of research were the mercantile history of south India and the history of women's traditional rights and occupations.

Life and career
Kanakalatha Narasimhan was born to Janaki Narasimhan and C.V. Narasimhan. Her father was a member of the Indian Civil Service and an Under-Secretary-General of the United Nations. She has a sister, Hemalatha. She graduated from Barnard College, New York City, in the class of 1962. In 1964, she married Jagannathan Mukund.

Kanakalatha Mukund has a PhD in economics. She worked at the University of Bombay, Bhopal University, and at the Centre for Economic and Social Studies, Hyderabad till retirement. Her areas of research were the mercantile history of south India and the history of women's traditional rights and occupations.

In her research on mercantile networks in Madras and the interaction between local and English traders, Mukund showed that the richest Indian merchants acted as moneylenders as well as brokers of letters of credit and forward agreements between producers such as weavers and the English. The English would pay the weavers in advance who would then find their own suppliers. The Indian traders themselves were divided along caste lines and competed with each other; the tension between them often erupted into violence. While in the earlier period of their interaction, the Indian producers were able to resist English attempts to control their supplies, over time, as English power expanded over south India, both the producers and their Indian merchant capitalist began to lose out, so that by 1725, south Indian textile commerce began to collapse.

Selected works

Articles

Books

References 

20th-century Indian historians
21st-century Indian historians
Living people
Date of birth missing (living people)
University of Mumbai people
Year of birth missing (living people)
Barnard College alumni
Indian women historians